James Lewis Parker (born 9 June 1994) is an Argentine handball player who plays as a left handed for Egyptian club Zamalek SC Handball and the Argentina national team.

Early life
Parker was born in San Nicolás de los Arroyos, Buenos Aires, and grew up in San Luis. His father, also named James Parker, played basketball in Argentina.

Individual awards
2022 South and Central American Men's Handball Championship: Best left back

References

1994 births
Living people
People from San Luis Province
Argentine male handball players
Argentine people of African-American descent
Argentine expatriate sportspeople in Spain
Expatriate handball players
Afro-Argentine sportspeople
American people of Argentine descent
Argentine people of American descent
21st-century Argentine people
South American Games gold medalists for Argentina
South American Games medalists in handball
Competitors at the 2022 South American Games